Batovka is a rural locality (a khutor) in Pervomayskoye Rural Settlement, Bogucharsky District, Voronezh Oblast, Russia. The population was 139 as of 2010. There are 3 streets.

Geography 
Batovka is located 42 km south of Boguchar (the district's administrative centre) by road. Nagibin is the nearest rural locality.

References 

Rural localities in Bogucharsky District